Joel Rasmus Felix (born 13 January 1998) is a Danish professional footballer who plays as a centre-back for Danish Superliga club Silkeborg IF.

Career

Youth years
Felix is the son of a Saint Lucian father and Danish mother. He moved to Denmark as a child with his family, and started playing football at Vanløse IF and later at B.93. He later ended up joining F.C. Copenhagen.

Senior career
Felix sat on the bench for one Danish Superliga game for F.C. Copenhagen in March 2016, but never got his official debut for the club, before he was sold to Dutch club FC Twente on 26 July 2017, where he was going to play for the reserve team, Jong FC Twente. Felix signed a two-year contract with an option for one further year.

After two years in the Netherlands, Felix returned to Denmark in the summer 2019, after signing with Danish 1st Division club Næstved Boldklub. He became a regular starter at the club and played 30 games during his spell at the club, but Næstved ended the season with relegation to the Danish 2nd Division.

On 20 August 2020, Felix signed a four-year deal with Danish 1st Division club Silkeborg IF. He got his debut on 27 September 2020 against FC Fredericia. He made 19 appearances throughout the season and helped Silkeborg with promotion to the 2021-22 Danish Superliga.

References

External links

Joel Felix at DBU

1998 births
Living people
Danish men's footballers
Denmark youth international footballers
Saint Lucian footballers
Danish people of Saint Lucian descent
Saint Lucian people of Danish descent
Association football defenders
Danish 1st Division players
Eerste Divisie players
Danish Superliga players
Vanløse IF players
Boldklubben af 1893 players
FC Twente players
Næstved Boldklub players
Silkeborg IF players
Danish expatriate men's footballers
Saint Lucian expatriate footballers
Danish expatriate sportspeople in the Netherlands
Expatriate footballers in the Netherlands